Pat Ercoli (born 30 November 1957) is a Canadian former professional soccer player who currently works as President of the Rochester New York FC.

Career
Ercoli played club football for the Rochester Lancers and the Jacksonville Tea Men in the North American Soccer League. In 1976, he played in the National Soccer League with Toronto Italia, and the following season with Montreal Castors. In August 1981, he returned to play with former team Toronto Italia. He played for the Cleveland Force of the Major Indoor Soccer League from 1985 to 1986.

International career
Ercoli earned one cap for the national team in 1980.

Coaching career
After retiring as a player, Ercoli coached the Rochester Rhinos from 1996 to 2004. On 29 October 2009 he returned to Rochester Rhinos and was appointed as the general manager.  Following a 1-6-1 start to the Rhinos' 2013 season, on 19 May Ercoli was named head coach, replacing Jesse Myers.

References 

1957 births
Living people
Canadian expatriate sportspeople in the United States
Canadian expatriate soccer players
Canada men's international soccer players
Canadian soccer coaches
Canadian soccer players
Canadian people of Italian descent
Toronto Italia players 
Montreal Castors players 
Buffalo Stallions players
Detroit Lightning players
Cleveland Force (original MISL) players
Expatriate soccer players in the United States
Association football forwards
Jacksonville Tea Men players
Major Indoor Soccer League (1978–1992) players
North American Soccer League (1968–1984) players
Soccer players from Toronto
Rochester Lancers (1967–1980) players
Toronto Blizzard (1971–1984) players
Baltimore Blast (1980–1992) players
USISL coaches
Canadian National Soccer League players
Rochester New York FC coaches
Rochester New York FC non-playing staff